State Route 208 (SR 208) is a numbered state highway in Maine. With the exception of its first , SR 208 runs concurrently with SR 9.

Route description
SR 208 begins at the intersection of Yates Street and Mile Stretch Road at Biddeford Pool. From there, it continues, signed as northbound but traveling in a southwesterly direction along the outer peninsula that separates the Biddeford Pool from the Atlantic Ocean. At the intersection of Mile Stretch Road and Bridge Road, SR 208 turns northward meeting SR 9 (Pool Street) near the Biddeford water tower.

State Routes 208 and 9 continue as a concurrent road north into downtown Biddeford. Along this stretch the road is still two lanes, but with a significantly wider shoulder. The routes pass through the campus of University of New England. Speed limits range from  approaching downtown Biddeford. SR 208 reaches its northern terminus at the intersection of Alfred Street (which carries SR 9 to the northeast and SR 111 to the southwest) and Jefferson Street.

Major junctions

References

External links

Floodgap Roadgap's RoadsAroundME: Maine State Route 208

208
Transportation in York County, Maine